Thyrocopa alterna is a moth of the family Xyloryctidae. It was first described by Lord Walsingham in 1907. It is endemic to the Hawaiian islands of Maui and Hawaii.

The length of the forewings is 8–15 mm. Adults are on wing at least from May to November. It is very similar to Thyrocopa abusa, but the male antennae are surrounded by cilia, and the male genitalia are without a dorsal ridge. Individuals from Maui generally are smaller than those from the island of Hawaii.

External links

Thyrocopa
Endemic moths of Hawaii
Moths described in 1907